The women's 10,000 metres event at the 2017 European Athletics U23 Championships was held in Bydgoszcz, Poland, at Zdzisław Krzyszkowiak Stadium on 14 July.

Records
Prior to the competition, the records were as follows:

Results

References

10000 metres
10,000 metres at the European Athletics U23 Championships